Vratimov is a town in Ostrava-City District in the Moravian-Silesian Region of the Czech Republic. It has about 7,300 inhabitants. It lies in the historical region of Cieszyn Silesia.

Administrative parts
The town part of Horní Datyně is an administrative part of Vratimov.

Geography
Vratimov lies in the Ostrava Basin lowland. It is located on the right bank of the Ostravice River, which forms the western border of the municipal territory.

History

Vratimov was founded during the colonization of Cieszyn Silesia in the second half of the 13th century. The first written mention is from 1305 under its Latin name Wrothimow. The Czech name was first used in 1598.

Politically the village belonged initially to the Duchy of Teschen, formed in 1290 in the process of feudal fragmentation of Poland and was ruled by a local branch of Piast dynasty. In 1327 the duchy became a fee of Kingdom of Bohemia, which after 1526 became part of the Habsburg monarchy.

Vratimov was traditionally agricultural. In the 1880s, a pulp mill was established here and soon paper and metallurgical production was established. Industrialization dramatically changed the character of the town.

Sights
There is a Catholic Church of Saint John the Baptist in the town. The first mention of a wooden church is from 1652. After this old church fell into disrepair, a new church was built next to him in 1806 and also consecrated to St. John the Baptist.

Twin towns – sister cities

Vratimov is twinned with:
 Senj, Croatia

References

External links

 

Cities and towns in the Czech Republic
Populated places in Ostrava-City District
Cieszyn Silesia